Rolf Skår (born 13 May 1941) is a Norwegian engineer. He was born in Karmøy as the son of a farmer and fisherman. In 1966 Skår graduated from Norwegian Institute of Technology where he studied under Prof. Balchen.

During his studies he had several periods abroad. In the summer of 1963 he went to Switzerland to work for an electrical products manufacturer. The following year he took part in the CERN Summer Student Programme working with digital technology and during the summer 1965 he worked for NATO Saclant in La Spezia, Italy.

He was a co-founder of the computer manufacturing company Norsk Data in 1967, and CEO of the company from 1978 to 1989. He was CEO of the Norwegian Space Centre from 1998 to 2006.

He is a fellow of the Norwegian Academy of Technological Sciences.

References

1941 births
Living people
People from Karmøy
Norwegian company founders
Norsk Data people
Members of the Norwegian Academy of Technological Sciences
Norwegian Institute of Technology alumni
People associated with CERN